Jordann Hickey (born 22 December 1994) is an Australian rules footballer who played for Melbourne and the Gold Coast in the AFL Women's (AFLW). She was drafted by Melbourne with their third selection and thirty-first overall in the 2018 AFLW draft. She was delisted by Melbourne at the end of the 2019 season without playing a match.

Hickey signed with Gold Coast during the 2019 free agency period in July. She made her debut against  at Blacktown ISP Oval in the opening round of the 2020 season. At the end of the 2021 season, Hickey was delisted by the Gold Coast after playing nine matches across two seasons.

Statistics 
Statistics are correct to the end of the 2020 season.

|- style="background-color:#EAEAEA"
! scope="row" style="text-align:center" | 2020
| 
| 4 || 7 || 1 || 1 || 50 || 14 || 64 || 8 || 17 || 0.1 || 0.1 || 7.1 || 2.0 || 9.1 || 1.1 || 2.4 || 
|- class="sortbottom"
! colspan=3 | Career
! 7 
! 1  
! 1
! 50 
! 14 
! 64
! 8 
! 17 
! 0.1
! 0.1
! 7.1 
! 2.0 
! 9.1 
! 1.1
! 2.4
! 
|}

References

External links 

1994 births
Living people
Gold Coast Football Club (AFLW) players
Australian rules footballers from the Northern Territory